Timeline is the first "best-of" compilation album by Japanese pop singer melody., released on October 8, 2008. It includes all of her a-sides from her debut single Dreamin' Away to her most recent single, Haruka. It was released in a CD-only edition as well as a CD + DVD edition and includes no new songs. A few b-sides are included, as well as a collaboration single with M-Flo.

This album is also her last release with Toy's Factory.

Track listing

CD
 Dreamin' Away
 Simple As That
 Over the Rainbow
 Crystal Love
 Believe Me
 So into You
 Next to You
 Realize
 Take a Chance
 See You...
 Lovin' U
 Finding My Road
 My Dear
 Love Story
 Haruka (遥花～はるか～; Eternal Flower)
 Miss You (M-Flo Melody. & Ryohei Yamamoto) (Bonus Track)

DVD
 Dreamin' Away (PV)
 Simple As That (PV)
 Crystal Love (PV)
 Believe Me (PV)
 Next to You (PV)
 Realize (PV)
 See You... (PV)
 Lovin' U (PV)
 Finding My Road (PV)
 Love Story (PV)
 Haruka (遥花～はるか～; Eternal Flower) (PV)
 Miss You (M-Flo Melody. & Ryohei Yamamoto) (PV)

Charts

References

Melody (Japanese singer) albums
2008 compilation albums